2013-14 Viborg FF will compete in the following competitions Danish Superliga and Danish Cup.

Danish Superliga

League table

Danish Cup

Current squad
As of 13 July 2013.

References

2013-14
Danish football clubs 2013–14 season